Ada Hayden (14 August 1884 – 12 August 1950) was an American botanist, educator, and preservationist. She was the curator of the Iowa State University Herbarium, which was renamed the Ada Hayden Herbarium (ISC) in her honour in 1988. During her career, she added more than 40,000 specimens to the herbarium. Her studies and conservation work were particularly important in ensuring the preservation of the tallgrass prairie.

The Hayden Prairie State Preserve, the first area dedicated as a preserve under Iowa's State Preserves Act of 1965, is named in her honor. Also named in her honor is the Ada Hayden Heritage Park in Ames, Iowa.

Childhood and education
Ada Hayden was born 14 August 1884 near Ames, Iowa to Maitland David Hayden and Christine Hayden. While still in high school,  Louis Hermann Pammel became her mentor.  She earned a bachelor's degree from Iowa State College in 1908, studying botany, a master's degree from Washington University in St. Louis in 1910, and a Ph.D. from Iowa State in 1918. She was the first woman and fourth person to receive a doctorate from Iowa State College.

Career
Hayden taught botany as an instructor at Iowa State beginning in 1911, and continued in this role until she earned her doctoral degree.  She became an assistant professor of botany in 1920, and a research assistant professor at the Agricultural Experimental Station (Lakes Region) and curator of the herbarium in 1934.  She worked closely with  Louis Pammel  and Charlotte King, contributing to The Weed Flora of Iowa (1926) and Honey Plants of Iowa (1930).

She concentrated on prairie plants of the lakes region, and is credited with "possibly the best published native flora survey… of any part of Iowa". She was an early advocate of prairie preservation, writing and speaking in its support. In 1944, she and J. M. Aikman released a report identifying possible areas of preservable prairie in Iowa and Hayden became director of the "Prairie Project".  She systematically developed a database of information relevant for decisions about land acquisition, working with the State Conservation Commission (SCC) to purchase areas of relict prairie.

She was an active member of the Ecological Society of America for many years.

Ada Hayden died of cancer in 1950, at age 65.

References

External links 
 
 Ada Hayden Papers at Iowa State University Library.
 "Botanist, Basketball Player, and Budding Conservationist: Ada Hayden's Student Years at Iowa State"
 Ada Hayden Digital Collection at Iowa State University Library

American ecologists
Women ecologists
1884 births
1950 deaths
American women botanists
Scientists from Iowa
Washington University in St. Louis alumni
Deaths from cancer in Iowa
20th-century American botanists
20th-century American women scientists
American women curators
American curators